Muthu Chippi is a 1968 Indian Tamil-language film, directed by M. Krishnan and produced by P. L. Mohan Ram. The film stars  Jaishankar, Jayalalithaa and Nagesh. It was released on 6 September 1968, and became a box office hit.

Plot

Cast 
Jaishankar as Prabha
Jayalalithaa as Geetha
Nagesh as Sathiyam
Shylashri as Dancer
Major Sundarrajan as Prabha's father
Thengai Srinivasan as Womanizer
C. K. Saraswathi as Pimpstress
Tambaram Lalitha
Ennathe Kannaiah as Hotel customer
Karikol Raju as Office staff
Loose Mohan as Hotel boy
K. Kannan as Prabha's friend
S. Ramanathan
S. R. Janaki
'Master' Prabhakar
'Baby' Vijaya

Soundtrack 
The music was composed by S. M. Subbaiah Naidu.

References

External links 
 

1960s Tamil-language films
1968 films
Films scored by K. V. Mahadevan